Berrwiller (dialectal name: Barwillr) is a commune in the Haut-Rhin department in Grand Est in northeastern France. It forms part of the Mulhouse Alsace Agglomération, the inter-communal local government body for the Mulhouse conurbation. Its inhabitants are called the Berrwillerois and Berrwilleroises.

Geography
Berrwiller is located at the foot of Hartmannswillerkopf (“Old Armand”) and is composed of the parts “Owerdorf”, “Unterdorf”, “Leimgrüab”, “Bertschwiller” and “Weckenthal”. In the southeast part of the village are Route nationale#Routes nationales 76 to 100 and in the northwest is the Alsace wine.

History
 796: The first mention of Berrwiller is in the files of Murbach, then under the name of Baronewillare.
 1441: The document liber marcarum teaches us that there are, in Berrwiller, priest and one vicar and that the church is dedicated to Saint Brigit of Kildare
 1697: The armorial bearings of Berrwiller (3 mountains of sinople surmounted by a S-shaped hook) appear for the first time in the armorial of the General information of Alsace.
 1766: Construction of the current church to replace the old church out of wood.
 1853: Construction of the current cemetery.
 1865: Creation of the very first body of the firemen of Berrwiller
 1885: Construction of the communal Lavoir; there remains nothing any more but the basin.
 1907: First phone line in the village
 1912: The electrification of the first streets and houses
 1914: Evacuation of the village in December, because it was located on the front line in World War I.
 1918: Return of population, a third destroyed and 21 soldiers of the village dead.
 1945: Release of the village on February 4.
 1953: Installation of mains drainage and running water
 1960: Construction of the underground mine in Berrwiller of MDPA
 1976: A serious accident underground in the mine when 5 minors fell.
 30 June 2007: A motorist deliberately drives their car into members of the public during a village fête, resulting in one fatality and seventeen injured (including two in critical condition).

Demographics

Sites and monuments
 
Berrwiller has had a church going back to 1766, a house of the 16th century, a presbytery of 1804 and one school of 1860.

Personalities related to the commune
Dr. Colonel Baur was a native of Berrwiller whose name was given to the area's military hospital. Colmar Lucien Herr Directeur was a librarian from the national library in Paris.

See also
 Communes of the Haut-Rhin department Internet site of the commune of Berrwiller

References

External links

 Berrwiller on the site of the national geographical Institute Internet site of the commune of Berrwiller

Communes of Haut-Rhin